Anastathes is a genus of longhorn beetles of the subfamily Lamiinae. , it consists of the following species:
 Anastathes biplagiata Gahan, 1901
 Anastathes nigricornis (Thomson, 1865)
 Anastathes parallela Breuning, 1956
 Anastathes parva Gressitt, 1935
 Anastathes robusta Gressitt, 1940

References

Astathini
Taxa named by Charles Joseph Gahan